The Sentencing Project is a Washington, D.C.-based research and advocacy center working for decarceration in the United States and seeking to address racial disparities in the criminal justice system. The organization produces nonpartisan reports and research for use by state and federal policymakers, administrators, and journalists.

History
The Sentencing Project grew out of pilot programs established by lawyer Malcolm C. Young in the early 1980s. In 1981, Young became director of a project of the National Legal Aid & Defender Association (NLADA) designed to establish defense-based sentencing advocacy programs. In 1986, Young incorporated The Sentencing Project as an independent organization to continue NLADA's program of training and development work. In the late 1980s, The Sentencing Project became engaged in research and public education on a broad range of criminal justice policy issues, and is primarily known for its work in these areas today.

Advocacy
The Sentencing Project works with other organizations and public officials to influence criminal justice policies at the federal, state, and local level. The Sentencing Project was part of a national coalition supporting the bipartisan Sentencing Reform and Corrections Act in the 114th Congress. The organization's executive director testified before the Senate Judiciary Committee in support of the legislation.

In 2010, The Sentencing Project contributed to the passage of the Fair Sentencing Act, which reduced the disparities in sentences associated with convictions for possessing or trafficking in crack cocaine compared to powder cocaine. Representatives of the organization have often testified before Congress, the U.S. Sentencing Commission, the U.S. Commission on Civil Rights, and other government and scholarly meetings.

Senate Minority Leader Richard Durbin (D-IL), a leader of the bipartisan congressional reform effort, said of The Sentencing Project: "They bring to our attention those specific cases that we can use to dramatize the need to get this done. I can't say enough for their research work."

Research 
As it celebrated its 30th anniversary in 2016, The Sentencing Project was active in the national debate about racial and ethnic disparities in arrests, sentencing and incarceration, and has monitored and reported on the denial of voting rights to individuals with felony convictions. It consistently criticizes what it considers the ineffectiveness and excessive public expense associated with mass incarceration and extended prison terms.

In 2016, the organization produced a state-by-state breakdown on the disenfranchisement of citizens convicted of felonies entitled Six Million Lost Voters. It documented 6.1 million potential voters, including more than 4 million who had long since completed their sentences, unable to participate because of state laws disenfranchising them. Florida, a perennial swing state, led the country with 1.5 million people convicted of felonies who could not vote. 

In recent years, The Sentencing Project has published reports and research on mandatory minimum sentences and their impact on judicial discretion; the increased reliance in the courts on life sentences, often without opportunities for parole; prison closures and repurposing; the impact of racial perceptions in criminal justice policy; the war on drugs and its collateral consequences; juvenile justice issues; women in prison; the children of prisoners and the long-term social impact of mass incarceration policies.

Leadership 
Marc Mauer has been the executive director of The Sentencing Project since 2005. He has authored a number of books, articles, and studies about the criminal justice system. University of Pittsburgh School of Law professor David Harris called Mauer "the go-to guy for any major media organization or any legislative body that wants the truth on what's been happening with our prisons and our jails ... His testimony to the Senate Judiciary Committee in October 2015 ... should be required reading for every public official in this country."

The Sentencing Project is governed by a 10-member board of lawyers, academics, and practitioners, chaired by American University law professor Cynthia E. Jones.

See also
 Felony disenfranchisement in the United States

References

External links
 Official website

Project
501(c)(3) organizations
Non-profit organizations based in Washington, D.C.
Political advocacy groups in the United States
Criminal justice reform in the United States